Timothy John Kirkby (born 13 November 1970 in Sidcup, Kent, England) is a British filmmaker, working in both the United Kingdom and the United States. He is best known for directing the science parody series Look Around You , the BAFTA winning BBC 2 show Stewart Lee's Comedy Vehicle, and setting up the multi-award winning Fleabag.

Career 
Kirkby made his TV directorial debut with the BAFTA nominated science spoof Look Around You. He received further recognition for the first season of the BAFTA nominated My Mad Fat Diary, the BAFTA nominated BBC single drama The C Word, and more recently the critically acclaimed Fleabag.

In the United States he created and directed all eight episodes and co-executive produced the award-winning first & second season of Brockmire for IFC. Other notable US television directing credits includes episodes of the Emmy-winning HBO comedy Veep (TV series), Grace & Frankie, Brooklyn Nine Nine, and Man Seeking Woman.

He has also made documentaries with Motörhead, Iron Maiden, and Judas Priest for the multi-award-winning documentary strand Classic Albums, as well as creating and directing all 4 series of the critically acclaimed BAFTA winning show 'Stewart Lee's Comedy Vehicle a six-part comedy series featuring standup and sketches. The first season was executive produced by Armando Iannucci and script edited by Chris Morris. The first episode received positive reviews from The Independent and The Daily Mirror, although the show received a negative review, written by Stewart Lee in Time Out, in which he described himself as "fat" and his performance as "positively Neanderthal, suggesting a jungle-dwelling pygmy, struggling to coax notes out of a clarinet that has fallen from a passing aircraft". The second series won a BAFTA for Best Comedy Programme in 2012.

His second film, a neo-noir detective story Last Looks set in Los Angeles starring Mel Gibson and Charlie Hunnam, was released in the US on 4 February 2022, and his Netflix 6-part TV series The Pentaverate created by Mike Myers, about a secret society that has been working to control world events since 1347, was released on 5 May 2022. 

Tim is currently directing and co-executive producing Entitled with Two Brothers for Showtime and Channel 4. The eight part series follows an American widower who must get to know his British wife's estranged family in their crumbling gothic mansion; production starts in August.

Filmography

Film

Television

Awards 
 2019 WON – VENICE TV AWARD - Best Comedy - Don't Forget the Driver
 2017 Nominated – BAFTA TV - Best Comedy - Fleabag
 2016 Nominated – BAFTA TV - Best Single Drama - The C Word
 2015 Nominated – BAFTA TV - Best Comedy Programme - Stewart Lee's Comedy Vehicle 3
 2014 Nominated – BRITISH COMEDY AWARDS - Best Comedy Entertainment Programme - Stewart Lee's Comedy Vehicle 3
 2014 Nominated – OFTA - Best DIRECTION - Veep season 3
 2014 Nominated – BAFTA TV - Best Drama Series - My Mad Fat Diary
 2014 Nominated – RTS - Best Drama Series - My Mad Fat Diary
 2014 Nominated – OFTA - Best DIRECTION - Veep season 2
 2012 WON – BAFTA TV - Best Comedy Programme - Stewart Lee's Comedy Vehicle 2
 2012 WON – BRITISH COMEDY AWARDS - Best Comedy Entertainment Programme - Stewart Lee's Comedy Vehicle 2
 2010 Nominated – BAFTA TV - Best Comedy Programme - Stewart Lee's Comedy Vehicle 1
 2008 WON – ROSE D'OR - Best Comedy - Kombat Opera
 2008 WON – ROSE D'OR - Best of 2008 - Kombat Opera
 2006 WON – ROSE D'OR - Best Comedy - Look Around You, season 2
 2003 Nominated – BAFTA TV - Best Comedy Programme - Look Around You, season 1
 2003 Nominated – BRITISH COMEDY AWARDS - Best New TV Comedy - Look Around You

Television (as actor) 
Look Around You (2005)

References

1970 births
Living people
British documentary film directors
English film directors
English film producers
English male screenwriters
English screenwriters
English television directors
English television producers
People from Sidcup